Pablo Agustín Barraza (born 4 May 2000) is an Argentine professional footballer who plays as a forward for Central Córdoba.

Career
Barraza started his career in the ranks of Central Córdoba. He made his first senior appearance during the Torneo Federal A club's title-winning campaign of 2017–18, which won them promotion to Primera B Nacional for 2018–19; that saw Barraza make his professional bow on 1 October 2018 against Brown.

Career statistics
.

Honours
Central Córdoba
Torneo Federal A: 2017–18

References

External links

2000 births
Living people
People from Santiago del Estero
Argentine footballers
Association football forwards
Torneo Federal A players
Primera Nacional players
Central Córdoba de Santiago del Estero footballers
Sportspeople from Santiago del Estero Province